The Women's 400 metre freestyle competition of the 2022 European Aquatics Championships was held on 17 August 2022.

Records
Prior to the competition, the existing world, European and championship records were as follows.

Results

Heats
The heats were started at 09:00.

Final
The final was held at 18:44.

References

Women's 400 metre freestyle